The 2022 Waltham Forest London Borough Council election was on 5 May 2022. All 60 members of Waltham Forest London Borough Council were elected. The elections took place alongside local elections in the other London boroughs and elections to local authorities across the United Kingdom. the Labour Party maintained its control of the council, winning 47 out of the 60 seats with the Conservative Party forming the council opposition with the remaining 13 seats.

Background

History 

The thirty-two London boroughs were established in 1965 by the London Government Act 1963. They are the principal authorities in Greater London and have responsibilities including education, housing, planning, highways, social services, libraries, recreation, waste, environmental health and revenue collection. Some of the powers are shared with the Greater London Authority, which also manages passenger transport, police and fire.

Since its formation, Waltham Forest has generall been under Labour control or no overall control with one period of Conservative control from 1968 to 1971. Labour won an overall majority from no overall control in the 2010 election, with 36 seats and 38.9% of the vote across the borough; with the Conservatives winning eighteen seats and the Liberal Democrats winning the remaining six. The Liberal Democrats lost all their seats in the 2014 election, with Labour winning 44 and the Conservatives winning 16. In the most recent election in 2018, Labour extended its majority by winning 44 seats with 58.1% of the vote across the borough while the Conservatives won 14 seats with 24.1% of the vote. The Liberal Democrats received 10.3% of the vote and the Green Party received 5.5% of the vote but neither won any seats.

There were by-elections in 2021. Geoff Walker, a Conservative councillor for Hatch Lane who had served on the council for 26 years, died in March 2020. Due to the COVID-19 pandemic, a by-election to fill the seat was not held until 6 May 2021 alongside the 2021 London mayoral election and London Assembly election. The eventual by-election was won by the Conservative candidate Justin Halabi. Chris Robbins, a Labour councillor for Grove Green and a former council leader, died in April 2021. Yemi Osho, a Labour councillor for Lea Bridge, resigned in the same month. By-elections for both seats were held on 10 June 2021. Labour won both seats, with the teacher and researcher Uzma Rasool winning in Grove Green and the NHS worker Jennifer Whilby winning in Lea Bridge.

In 2021 new ward boundaries were established following review by the Local Government Boundary Commission for England. The number of councillors remain at sixty but the commission produced new boundaries following a period of consulation, with sixteen three-member wards and six two-member wards.

Electoral process 
Waltham Forest, like other London borough councils, elects all of its councillors at once every four years. The 2022 election was by multi-member first-past-the-post voting, with each ward being represented by two or three councillors. Electors had as many votes as there were councillors to be elected in their ward, with the top two or three being elected.

All registered electors (British, Irish, Commonwealth and European Union citizens) living in London aged 18 or over were entitled to vote in the election. People who live at two addresses in different councils, such as university students with different term-time and holiday addresses, are entitled to be registered for and vote in elections for both local authorities. Voting in-person at polling stations will take place from 7:00 to 22:00 on election day, and voters will be able to apply for postal votes or proxy votes in advance of the election.

Previous council composition

Results summary

Ward Results

Cann Hall

Cathall

Chapel End

Chingford Green

Endlebury

Forest

Grove Green

Hale End & Highams Park South

Hatch Lane & Highams Park North

High Street

Higham Hill

Hoe Street

Larkswood

Lea Bridge

Leyton

Leytonstone

Markhouse

St. James

Upper Walthamstow

Valley

William Morris

Wood Street

References 

Council elections in the London Borough of Waltham Forest
Waltham Forest